Lac-Nilgaut is a large unorganized territory in the Outaouais region, Quebec, Canada.

The name was officially introduced in 1935, but it is unknown why this term was chosen to replace the original name Lac à l'Orignal (Moose Lake).

Lake Nilgaut drains via the Nilgaut creek into the Noire River, a major river that, together with the Coulonge River, bisects the territory.

Demographics

See also
 List of unorganized territories in Quebec

References

External links

Unorganized territories in Outaouais